The Gwalior campaign was fought between the British and Maratha forces in Gwalior in India, December 1843.

Background 

The Maratha Empire had controlled much of central and northern India and but fell to the British in 1818, giving the British control over almost all of the Indian subcontinent. The Maharaja of Gwalior had died and a young child was appointed as the Maharaja with British support. However, Marathas in Gwalior saw the failed British campaign in Afghanistan as an opportunity to regain independence and removed the young Maharaja. Lord Ellenborough, foreseeing the possibility of the Marathas in Gwalior attempting independence had formed the Army of Exercise near Agra. After attempts to negotiate failed, the British advanced in a two-pronged attack. The British, under the command of Gen. Sir Hugh Gough clashed with Maratha forces, under the command of Maharaja Scindia, in two battles on the same day; 29 December 1843.

Battle of Maharajpore 

The Maratha army had 14 battalions, 1,000 artillerymen with 60 guns, and 6,000 cavalry at Maharajpore. The British had the 40th Regiment of Foot with the 2nd and 16th Native Infantry Regiments forming the central column, the 39th Regiment of Foot with the 56th Native Infantry Regiment and a field battery forming the left column and the 16th Lancers with two troops of horse artillery as well as other artillery forming the right column.

The center column advanced to attack where they believed the main enemy force was located. However, during the night the Marathas had moved and the British were surprised as they came under heavy fire from the Maratha artillery in their new positions. The central column then received the order to take the battery positions, which they did under continuous heavy fire from shot, grape, canister, and chain. The guns were to the south-east of Maharajpore, with two battalions of Maratha troops for each battery, and in Maharajpore with seven battalions for each battery. The British engaged the Marathas in hand-to-hand fighting, both sides taking heavy casualties, and cleared the positions. The Marathas fought hard, and few escaped. The British finally defeated the Marathas, suffering 797 men killed, wounded, or missing. The Marathas were estimated to have lost 3000 to 4000 men.

Battle of Punniar 

The Marathas at Punniar (29 December 1843) numbered about 12,000 men and occupied the high ground near Mangore. As the British Army approached, they immediately attacked the Maratha positions, driving them from the hill.

Aftermath 

After the defeat of the Maratha forces in Gwalior, the British disbanded their army and established a force in the state that the government of Gwalior maintained. A British governor was appointed at Gwalior Fort. The British soldiers who participated in the campaign were awarded a medal, the Gwalior Star.

References

Conflicts in 1843
Battles involving British India
19th-century military history of the United Kingdom
1843 in India
1843 in British India
History of Madhya Pradesh
Gwalior